The Sri Lanka men's national cricket team, ( Shri Lanka Jathika Krikat Kandayama) nicknamed The Lions, represents Sri Lanka in men's international cricket. It is a Full Member of the International Cricket Council (ICC) with Test, One-Day International (ODI) and T20 International (T20I) status. The team first played international cricket (as Ceylon) in 1926–27, and were later awarded Test status in 1981, which made Sri Lanka the eighth Test cricket playing nation. The team is administered by Sri Lanka Cricket.

Sri Lanka's national cricket team achieved considerable success beginning in the 1990s, rising from underdog status to winning the Cricket World Cup in 1996, under the captaincy of Arjuna Ranatunga. Since then, the team has continued to be a force in international cricket. The Sri Lankan cricket team reached the finals of the 2007 and 2011 Cricket World Cups consecutively. They ended up being runners-up on both occasions.

Sri Lanka won the Cricket World Cup in 1996 (vs Australia), the ICC Champions Trophy in 2002 (co-champions with India), and the ICC T20 World Cup in 2014 (vs India). They have been consecutive runners up in the 2007 and 2011 Cricket World Cups, and have been runners up in the ICC T20 World Cup in 2009 and 2012. The Sri Lankan cricket team currently holds several world records, including the world record for the highest team total in Test cricket.

History

Underdog era
Cricket was introduced to the island by the British as a result of the colonization and the first recorded match dates back to 1832 as reported in The Colombo Journal. By the 1880s a national team, the Ceylon national cricket team, was formed which began playing first-class cricket by the 1920s. The Ceylon national cricket team achieved Associate Member status of the International Cricket Council in 1965. Renamed Sri Lanka in 1972, the national team first competed in top-level international cricket in 1975, when they were defeated by nine wickets by the West Indies during the 1975 Cricket World Cup at Old Trafford, England.

Sri Lanka was awarded Test cricket status in 1981 by the International Cricket Conference. They played their first Test match against England at P. Saravanamuttu Stadium, Colombo, on 17 February 1982. Bandula Warnapura was the captain for Sri Lanka in that match, which England won by 7 wickets. After Sri Lanka was awarded Test status on 21 July 1981 as eighth Test playing nation, they had to wait until 6 September 1985, where Sri Lanka recorded their first Test win by beating India, in the second match of the series by 149 runs at the Paikiasothy Saravanamuttu Stadium, Colombo. They have also won the 2001-02 Asian Test Championship, defeating Pakistan in the final by an innings and 175 runs.

Sri Lanka won their first Test match under the leadership of Duleep Mendis on 11 September 1985 against India, winning by 149 runs at P. Saravanamuttu Stadium. Eventually they won the three-match Test series, 1–0. Sri Lanka had to wait more than seven years for their next series victory, which came against New Zealand in December 1992, when they won the two-match series 1–0. This was immediately followed by a one-wicket victory against England in a one-Test series.

Two years later, on 15 March 1995, Sri Lanka won their first overseas Test match under the leadership of Arjuna Ranatunga against New Zealand, when they beat them by 241 runs at Napier. This win also resulted in their first overseas Test series victory, 1–0. Their next series too was an overseas series, against Pakistan, and that one too resulted in Sri Lankan victory.

Sri Lanka registered their first ODI win against India at Old Trafford, England on 16 June 1979.

Modern era 

After many years of underdog status, Sri Lanka finally entered the limelight of the cricketing world after winning the 1996 Cricket World Cup under the captaincy of Arjuna Ranatunga. Meanwhile, they revolutionized modern day batting strategies by rapid scoring during the first 15 overs. Sri Lanka later became the co-champions in 2002 ICC Champions Trophy and also became six times Asian champions in 1986, 1997, 2004, 2008, 2014 and 2022.

On 11 September 1999, under the leadership of Sanath Jayasuriya, Sri Lanka won their first Test match against Australia, when they beat them by six wickets at Asgiriya Stadium, Kandy. Eventually they won the three-match Test series, 1–0.

On 14 June 2000, Sri Lanka played their 100th Test match. It was against Pakistan, at SSC, Colombo, under the leadership of Sanath Jayasuriya. Pakistan won by 5 wickets.

On 4 August 2016, they played their 250th Test match when they played Australia in Galle. They won the match by 229 runs, and also won the Warne-Muralidharan trophy for the first time since its inception. On 17 August 2016, under the leadership of Angelo Mathews, Sri Lanka whitewashed Australia 3-0 for the first time in Test cricket.

Until 2017, Sri Lanka had whitewashed Zimbabwe three times, Bangladesh once and Australia once in Test cricket.

Sri Lanka played their first day-night Test match on 6 October 2017 against Pakistan at Dubai International Cricket Stadium. Under the captaincy of Dinesh Chandimal, Sri Lanka convincingly won the match by 68 runs and sweep the series 2–0. In the match, Dimuth Karunaratne became the first Sri Lankan to score a fifty, a century and a 150 in a day-night Test. Lahiru Gamage, who debut in the match became the first Sri Lankan to take a wicket in a day-night Test, whereas Dilruwan Perera became the first Sri Lankan to take five-wicket haul in a day-night Test.

Sri Lanka played their first Twenty20 International (T20I) match at the Rose Bowl, on 15 June 2006, against England, winning the match by 2 runs. In 2014, they won the 2014 ICC World Twenty20, defeating India by 6 wickets.

As of July 2018, Sri Lanka have faced nine teams in Test cricket, only recent Test nations Afghanistan and Ireland are missing from their list of opponents, with their most frequent opponent being Pakistan, playing 55 matches against them. Sri Lanka has registered more wins against Pakistan and Bangladesh than any other team, with 14. In ODI matches, Sri Lanka has played against 17 teams; they have played against India most frequently, with a winning percentage of 39.49 in 149 matches. Within usual major ODI nations, Sri Lanka have defeated England on 34 occasions, which is their best record in ODIs. The team have competed against 13 countries in T20Is, and have played 15 matches against New Zealand. Sri Lanka have defeated Australia and West Indies 6 occasions each. Sri Lanka was the best T20I team in the world, where they ranked number one in more than 32 months, and reached World Twenty20 final in three times.

As of 10 July 2018, Sri Lanka have played 272 Test matches; they have won 86 matches, lost 101 matches, and 85 matches were drawn. As of 10 July 2018, Sri Lanka have played 816 ODI matches, winning 376 matches and losing 399; they also tied 5 matches, whilst 36 had no result. As of 10 July 2018, Sri Lanka have played 108 T20I matches and won 54 of them; 52 were lost and 1 tied and 1 no result match as well.

From 8 July 2017 to 23 October 2017, Sri Lanka lost twelve consecutive ODI matches, which is their second longest losing run in ODIs. In the meantime, Sri Lanka involved 5-0 whitewash in three times against South Africa, India and Pakistan in 2017. And a 3-0 whitewash against the West Indies 3 years later (2020).

On 09 september 2019, Sri lanka won the t20i series 3-0 against pakistan in their home under the Dasun Shanaka's Captanicy. It's sri lanka's first t20i whitewash against pakistan.Under his captanicy sri lanka won the first ever T20i 2-1,recording the first bilateral t20i series win against india in 2021.

On 03 December 2021 Sri Lanka Whitewashed west indies 2-0, won the Sobers-Tissera Trophy 2nd time in Test Cricket.

Sri Lanka played their 300th Test match in 2022. under Dimuth Karunaratne captanicy, in Mohali against india , India won by an innings and 222 runs.

Amid political turmoil back home, Sri Lanka won the 2022 Asia Cup, defeating Pakistan in the final.

Governing body

Sri Lanka Cricket (formerly the Board for Cricket Control or BCCSL), is the governing body for cricket in Sri Lanka. It operates the Sri Lankan cricket team and first-class cricket within Sri Lanka. Sri Lanka Cricket oversees the progress and handling of the major domestic competitions: the First-class tournament Premier Trophy, the List A tournament Premier Limited Overs Tournament and the Twenty20 Tournament. Sri Lanka Cricket also organises and hosts the Inter-Provincial Cricket Tournament, a competition where five teams take part and represent four different provinces of Sri Lanka.

Most of the regions of Sri Lanka that are rural areas apart from the Capital could not produce the successful cricketers to the national and international side yet due to the lack of resources and opportunities while only a few major areas such as Galle, Matara, Kandy, Kurunegala usually produce successful cricketers to the national and international side instead of the capital. So the government is trying to distribute the game within the whole country organizing some programs such as 2017–18 Super Four Provincial Tournament.

International grounds

Note: Except abandoned and cancelled matches.
 Updated 12 August 2022.

Team colours
Similar to other Sri Lankan sports teams, the Sri Lankan national cricket team bears blue and yellow as their colours. The bright blue represents the surrounding ocean, while the golden yellow represents the united island as a whole (depicting the sand).

In Test matches, the team wears cricket whites, with an optional sweater or sweater-vest with a dark blue and blue V-neck for use in cold weather, such as on Australia, England, and New Zealand tours. The Sri Lankan flag is found on the left side of the jersey's chest with the Test cap number usually below the flag; helmets are a deep blue and the fielder's hat (usually a baseball cap or a wide-brimmed sunhat) is coloured similar. The sponsor's logo is displayed on the right side of the chest and the sleeve with the Sri Lankan Cricket logo is deployed on the left in test cricket.

Sri Lanka's One Day and Twenty 20 kits vary from year to year with the team wearing its bright blue colour in various shades from kit to kit with yellow stripes on shoulders and waist. Historically, Sri Lanka's kits have had shades of bright blue and golden yellow. In the World Series Cup in 1984–85, Sri Lanka wore yellow uniforms with blue stripes.

For official ICC tournaments such as ICC Cricket World Cup, ICC World Twenty20 and Asia Cup, "SRI LANKA" is written on the front of the jersey in place of the sponsor logo, with the sponsor logo being placed on the sleeve. A remarkable change in the colour of the kit of Sri Lanka can be found during the 2007 ICC World Twenty20 edition in South Africa. The team-coloured with pale silver and the kit has never been seen since then in the team. Since then, the Sri Lankan kit has never changed from the usual brilliant blue colour and very fine yellow stripes. For 2016 ICC World Twenty20, orange and green colours in the flag are also included in the jersey. In 2017 ICC Champions Trophy pool game against India, the kit changed to the mostly yellow coloured shirt with stripes of blue and usual blue trousers.

In 2019 for the 2019 Cricket World Cup, the Sri Lankan jersey was made from recycled plastic sea waste from the Sri Lankan coast. On the side of the blue background, there is a drawing of a turtle on the shirt.
However, for non-ICC tournaments and bilateral and tri-nation matches, the sponsor logo features prominently on the front of the shirt.

Logo 
Sri Lanka's cricket team's logo is a golden lion with a sword bearing on the right arm and the background is bright blue in colour. The name "Sri Lanka Cricket" is written below the lion. In Test cricket, the logo in the cap is slightly changed, where the lion with a sword is surrounded by petals of lotus and then a blue circle surrounds the crest and a yellow circle surrounds the blue circle, present in the coat of arms.

Sponsorship 
The period between 2000 and 2010 saw the sponsorship pass between Ceylon tea, Reebok, Mobitel Sri Lanka and Dialog Axiata; Dilmah has remained a sponsor since the early 2000s, replacing Singer, which was the main sponsor in the 1990s. Former manufacturers were Reebok, AJ Sports, Asics, ISC, and Adidas.

Currently, the main sponsors for Sri Lanka cricket are Dialog Axiata, Jat Holdings and MAS Holdings.

Tournament history

Honours

ICC
World Cup:
 Champions (1): 1996
 Runners-up (2): 2007, 2011
T20 World Cup:
 Champions (1): 2014
 Runners-up (2): 2009. 2012
Champions Trophy:
 Champions (1): 2002

ACC
Asia Cup:
 Champions (6): 1986, 1997, 2004, 2008, 2014, 2022
 Runners-up (6): 1984, 1988, 1990–91, 1995, 2000, 2010
Asian Test Championship:
 Champions (1): 2001–02
 Runners-up (1): 1998–99

Others
Asian Games
 Gold Medal (1): 2014
South Asian Games
 Silver Medal (2): 2010, 2019

Current squad

This is a list of players who are centrally contracted with SLC or has played for Sri Lanka in the past 12 months or has been named in the recent Test, ODI or T20I squad. Uncapped players are listed in italics. Updated on 17 January 2023.

Note - Suranga Lakmal played for Sri Lanka in this period, but has since then announced his retirement from international cricket.

The SLCB awards central contracts to its players, its pay graded according to the importance of the player. Players' base salaries are as follows:

 Grade A1 – US$100,000
 Grade A2 – US$  80,000
Grade A3 – US$  70,000
 Grade B1 – US$  65,000
Grade B2 – US$  60,000
Grade B3 – US$  55,000
 Grade C1 – US$  50,000
Grade C2 – US$  45,000
Grade C3 – US$  40,000
 Grade D1 – US$  35,000
Grade D2 – US$  30,000
Grade D3 – US$  25,000

Coaching staff

Selection Panel
  Pramodya Wickramasinghe (Chairman) 
  Romesh Kaluwitharana
  Hemantha Wickramaratne

Coaching history
1995–1996:  Dav Whatmore
1997–1998:  Bruce Yardley
1998–1999:  Roy Dias
1999–2003:  Dav Whatmore
2003–2005:  John Dyson
2005–2007:  Tom Moody
2007–2011:  Trevor Bayliss
2011:  Stuart Law (interim)
2011:  Rumesh Ratnayake (interim)
2011–2012:  Geoff Marsh
2012–2013:  Graham Ford
2013–2014:  Paul Farbrace
2014–2015:  Marvan Atapattu
2015–2016:  Jerome Jayaratne (interim)
2016–2017:  Graham Ford
2017:  Nic Pothas (interim)
2017–2019:  Chandika Hathurusingha
2019–2021:  Mickey Arthur
2022:  Rumesh Ratnayake (interim)
2022–present:  Chris Silverwood

Records and statistics

International match summary 

Updated: 23 October 2022

Test matches

Test team records
Highest team total: 952/6 dec. v. India at RPS, Colombo in 1997
Lowest team total: 71 v. Pakistan at Asgiriya in 1994
Sri Lanka holds the world record for the highest team score, 952/6

Test individual records
Most matches: 149 Tests – Mahela Jayawardene
Longest-serving captain: 56 Tests – Arjuna Ranatunga

Test batting records
Most runs: 12,400 – Kumar Sangakkara
Best average: 57.40 – Kumar Sangakkara
Highest individual score: 374 – Mahela Jayawardene v. South Africa at SSC, Colombo in 2006
Highest partnership: 624 – Kumar Sangakkara and Mahela Jayawardene v. South Africa at SSC, Colombo in 2006
Most centuries: 38 – Kumar Sangakkara

Test bowling records
Most wickets: 800 – Muttiah Muralitharan
Best average: 22.67 – Muttiah Muralitharan
Best figures in an innings: 9/51 – Muttiah Muralitharan v. Zimbabwe at Asgiriya in 2002
Best figures in a match: 16/220 – Muttiah Muralitharan v. England at The Oval in 1998
Best strike rate: 51.5 – Lasith Malinga
Best economy rate: 2.33 – Don Anurasiri

Test fielding records
Most catches by an outfielder: 205 – Mahela Jayawardene
Most dismissals as wicketkeeper: 156 – Prasanna Jayawardene
Most dismissals in an innings: 6 – Amal Silva v. India at SSC, Colombo in 1985 and Dinesh Chandimal v. Pakistan at PSS, Colombo in 2015
Most dismissals in a match: 9 – Amal Silva v. India at SSC, Colombo & PSS, Colombo in 1985 and Prasanna Jayawardene v. Pakistan at Dubai in 2014

Test record versus other nations

One Day Internationals

ODI team records
Highest team total: 443/9 (50 overs) v. Netherlands at VRA Cricket Ground in 2006
Lowest team total: 43 (20.1 overs) v. South Africa at Boland Park in 2012
Sri Lanka holds the world record for maximum defeats in ODI history- 438.

ODI individual records
Most matches: 443 – Mahela Jayawardene
Longest-serving captain: 193 matches – Arjuna Ranatunga

ODI batting records
Most runs: 14,234 – Kumar Sangakkara
Best average: 41.97 –Kumar Sangakkara
Best strike rate: 112.59 – Thisara Perera
Highest individual score: 189 – Sanath Jayasuriya v. India at Sharjah Cricket Stadium in 2000
Highest partnership: 286* – Sanath Jayasuriya and Upul Tharanga v. England at Headingley in 2006
Most centuries: 28 – Sanath Jayasuriya
Most Sixes: 268 – Sanath Jayasuriya

ODI bowling records
Most wickets: 534 – Muttiah Muralitharan
Best average: 21.87 – Ajantha Mendis
Best figures in an innings: 8/19 – Chaminda Vaas v. Zimbabwe at Colombo (SSC) in 2001
Best strike rate: 27.3 – Ajantha Mendis
Best economy rate: 3.93 – Muttiah Muralitharan

ODI fielding records
Most catches by an outfielder: 212 – Mahela Jayawardene
Most dismissals as wicketkeeper: 473 – Kumar Sangakkara
Most dismissals in a match: 5 – Guy de Alwis v. Australia at Colombo (PSS) in 1983; Hashan Tillakaratne v. Pakistan at Sharjah Cricket Stadium in 1990; Romesh Kaluwitharana v. Pakistan at Sharjah Cricket Stadium in 1995; Kumar Sangakkara v. Netherlands at Colombo (RPS) in 2002

ODI record versus other nations

T20 Internationals

T20I team records
Highest team total: 260/6 v. Kenya at Johannesburg in 2007
Lowest team total: 79 v. India at Visakhapatnam in 2016

T20I individual records
Most matches: 85 – Dasun Shanaka
Longest-serving captain: 45 matches – Dasun Shanaka

T20I batting records
Most runs: 1,889 – Tillakaratne Dilshan
Best average: 31.77 – Mahela Jayawardene
Best strike rate: 147.67 – Thisara Perera
Highest individual score: 104* – Tillakaratne Dilshan v. Australia at Pallekele in 2011
Highest partnership: 166 – Mahela Jayawardene and Kumar Sangakkara v. West Indies at Kensington Oval in 2010
Most centuries: 1 – Tillakaratne Dilshan, Mahela Jayawardene
Most Sixes: 53 – Thisara Perera

T20I bowling records
Most wickets: 107 – Lasith Malinga
Best average: 14.42 – Ajantha Mendis
Best bowling: 6/8 – Ajantha Mendis v. Zimbabwe at Hambantota in 2012
Best strike rate: 13.4 – Ajantha Mendis
Best economy rate: 6.45 – Ajantha Mendis

T20I fielding records
Most catches by an outfielder: 29 – Thisara Perera
Most dismissals as wicketkeeper: 45 – Kumar Sangakkara
Most dismissals in an innings: 4 – Dinesh Chandimal v. South Africa at Johannesburg in 2017

T20I record versus other nations

See also
 Cricket in Sri Lanka
 List of Sri Lanka national cricket captains
 List of Sri Lanka ODI cricketers
 List of Sri Lanka Test cricketers
 List of Sri Lanka Twenty20 International cricketers
 Sri Lanka women's national cricket team
 Lanka Premier League

References

External links
 

National cricket teams
Cricket
Sri Lanka in international cricket
Sri Lankan terrorism victims